Anisimova Polyana is a rural locality (a selo) in Pisarevsky Selsoviet, Sharansky District, Bashkortostan, Russia. The population was 83 as of 2010. There is 1 street.

Geography 
Anisimova Polyana is located 22 km northwest of Sharan (the district's administrative centre) by road. Starodrazhzhevo is the nearest rural locality.

References 

Rural localities in Sharansky District